This is a list of pre-statehood alcaldes and mayors of San Francisco, from 1779 to 1850, during the Spanish, Mexican, and early American periods, prior to California's admission to statehood.

Spanish era 

California's first governor Felipe de Neve ordered all of the Missions to elect local Alcaldes (a combination of Mayor and Magistrate) around 1779.

Mexican era

American era

See also
List of pre-statehood mayors of Los Angeles
List of pre-statehood mayors of San Jose
List of pre-statehood mayors of San Diego

References

mayors
San Francisco
San Francisco
Pre-statehood history of California